Fayez Bandar (born on December 7, 1983) is a Kuwaiti footballer (defender) playing currently for Al Qadisiya Kuwait and Kuwait national football team. He scored a fluke goal against Australia in a 2–2 draw.

External links
 

Living people
1983 births
Kuwaiti footballers
Qadsia SC players

Association football defenders
Kuwait international footballers
Al Salmiya SC players
Kuwait Premier League players